The Hunter's Cross is a 1954 West German drama film directed by Hermann Kugelstadt and starring Jester Naefe, Armin Dahlen and Wera Frydtberg. It was part of the heimatfilm tradition, which was at its peak as this time.

The film's sets were designed by the art director Max Seefelder. It was shot at the Bavaria Studios in Munich and on location in Mittenwald.

Cast
 Jester Naefe as Dagmar Kobbe
 Armin Dahlen as Andreas
 Wera Frydtberg as Frani Kilian
 Albert Hehn as Gastwirt Michael
 Gert Fröbe as Kobbe
 Franz Muxeneder as Philipp
 Beppo Brem as Knecht Beppo
 Michl Lang as Kilian
 Bobby Todd as Dr. Specht
 Charlott Daudert as Pauline
 Hans Hermann Schaufuß as Emil
 Georg Bauer as Stefan Jäger
 Bertl Schultes as Bürgermeister
 Hans von Morhart as Ein Ingenieur
 Cordula Grun as Dienstmädchen
 Rosl Kern-Schultes as Marilre Magd
 Angelika Meissner as Ursula Andreas Schwester

References

Bibliography
 Willi Höfig. Der deutsche Heimatfilm 1947–1960. F. Enke, 1973.

External links 
 

1954 films
1954 drama films
German drama films
West German films
1950s German-language films
Films directed by Hermann Kugelstadt
Films shot at Bavaria Studios
Films shot in Bavaria
Films set in the Alps
German black-and-white films
1950s German films